Arnold Petrus Maria Vanderlyde (born 24 January 1963) is a Dutch former amateur boxer, who participated in three Summer Olympics (1984, 1988 and 1992) and won three bronze medals in the heavyweight division (≤91 kg). He started boxing at age fifteen. Although Vanderlyde was a three-time European champion and seven-time Dutch champion, he never turned professional. After ending his boxing career in 1992, he entered the corporate world as a motivational speaker.

Olympic results 
1984
 1st round bye
 Defeated Egerton Forster (Sierra Leone) 4-1
 Defeated Georgios Stefanopoulos (Greece) 5-0
 Lost to Willie DeWitt (Canada) 2-3

1988
 1st round bye
 Defeated Henry Akinwande (Great Britain) 3-2
 Defeated Gyula Alvics (Hungary) 5-0
 Lost to Ray Mercer (United States) RSC 2

1992
 Defeated Emilio Leti (American Samoa) 14-0
 Defeated Sung-Bae Chae (South Korea) 14-13
 Defeated Paul Douglas (Ireland) RSC 1 (1:30)
 Lost to Félix Savón (Cuba) 3-23

External links
 Personal website (Dutch)
 

1963 births
Living people
Boxers at the 1984 Summer Olympics
Boxers at the 1988 Summer Olympics
Boxers at the 1992 Summer Olympics
Dutch male boxers
Dutch sportspeople of Surinamese descent
Heavyweight boxers
Olympic boxers of the Netherlands
Olympic bronze medalists for the Netherlands
Olympic medalists in boxing
Medalists at the 1984 Summer Olympics
Medalists at the 1988 Summer Olympics
Medalists at the 1992 Summer Olympics
People from Sittard
AIBA World Boxing Championships medalists
Sportspeople from Limburg (Netherlands)